The deCordova Sculpture Park and Museum is a sculpture park and contemporary art museum on the shore of Flint's Pond in Lincoln, Massachusetts, 20 miles northwest of Boston. It was established in 1950. It is the largest park of its kind in New England, encompassing 30 acres.

Providing a constantly changing landscape of large-scale, outdoor, modern and contemporary sculpture and site-specific installations, the Sculpture Park displays more than 60 works, most on loan to the museum. Inside, the museum features rotating exhibitions. DeCordova's permanent collection focuses on works in all media, with particular emphasis on photography and works by artists with connections to New England.

History

DeCordova Sculpture Park and Museum is located on the former estate of Julian de Cordova (1851-1945). The self-educated son of a Jamaican merchant, Julian became a successful tea broker, wholesale merchant, investor, and president of the Union Glass Company in Somerville, Massachusetts. He married into the locally prominent Dana family of Boston. Julian and his wife Elizabeth traveled around the globe collecting art. Inspired by his trips to Spain and his own Spanish heritage, Julian remodeled his summer home in Lincoln in 1910 to resemble a European castle. His exposure to the visual arts abroad also influenced his management of the Union Glass Company, which under his stewardship produced ornamental glass to rival the quality of his European competitors.

In his later years, Julian opened the doors of his estate to share his collection. He gave his property to the town of Lincoln in 1930 with the stipulation that his estate would become a public museum of art following his death in 1945. Julian's will established a committee of incorporation, whose duties included formulating the policy, objectives, and supervision of the new museum with the guidance of professionals in the field, such as the Director of the Museum of Fine Arts (MFA) in Boston. 

Independent appraisers determined that Julian's collections were not of substantial interest or value, so the collection was sold and the proceeds were used to create a museum of regional contemporary art. The Trustees reached this decision after they noticed the near absence of modern art exhibitions in the Boston area, and the lack of venues for works by regional contemporary artists. When it officially opened in 1950 as the DeCordova and Dana Museum, it was the only museum to focus its exhibitions and collecting activities on living New England artists, while also offering an educational program in the visual arts.

The founding director was Frederick P. Walkey, a graduate of the School of the Museum of Fine Arts, Boston. He aggressively organized an exhibition schedule and arts instruction program with a clear educational mandate. DeCordova established a reputation for ground-breaking exhibitions that introduced New England audiences to important trends within contemporary art both regionally and nationally, including Pop Art and Boston's post-war expressionist movement. It changed its name to the deCordova Museum and Sculpture Park in around 1989. Georgia Litwack taught photography courses at the deCordova.

In 2019, deCordova was acquired by The Trustees of Reservations, a land conservation and historic preservation non-profit.

DeCordova is under the artistic direction  of Jessica May.   The prior director of deCordova was John Ravenal, who was appointed in 2015.

Architecture

The New England architect John Quincy Adams designed the extensive renovations that transformed Julian de Cordova's mansion into a public museum prior to its opening in 1950. The lower floors housed galleries, while the third floor offered studio art classes. The School attracted hundreds of students, eventually overwhelming the limited space within the Museum. In 1966, deCordova constructed a complex of four studio buildings to accommodate its expanded educational programs and meet the equipment standards of a professional art studio. In the early 1980s, the Museum consolidated and renovated two existing buildings to form administrative offices for the School and its outreach programs.

In 1998, the institution completed the New Century Campaign for deCordova, an $8 million effort to upgrade its building. Kallmann McKinnell & Wood modernized and expanded deCordova’s educational facilities to include a new studio, a store, and a gallery dedicated to exhibitions by School instructors and students. The Museum’s exhibition space was expanded with a 20,000 square foot addition and a roof terrace to provide views of the Park. The main galleries were renovated to install a climate control system, a café, and a library.

Art

DeCordova's emphasis on modern and contemporary art fueled its rapid popularity during the 1950s and 1960s, but by the 1980s, the Museum faced competition from a growing number of local museums, universities, and private galleries all of which shared a similar artistic mission. With the arrival of director Paul Master-Karnik in 1982, deCordova initiated a series of curatorial programs to further strengthen its commitment to New England’s contemporary artists. Master-Karnik introduced the Annual Exhibition, formerly Artist/Visions, which featured works by emerging New England artists and provided an annual snapshot of regional talent.

To maintain the institution’s connection to New England and its support for local emerging artists, former director Dennis Kois (appointed in 2008) established the PLATFORM series, an ongoing exhibition series of site-specific installations by New England artists. In 2010 the deCordova Biennial replaced the Annual Exhibition series to expand the curatorial voice, allowing for an advisory board and co-curator opportunities. Now occurring every other year, the deCordova Biennial displays New England’s leading emerging to mid-career artists, emphasizing the quality and vitality of the art created in this region.

In order to emphasize its focus, the Museum officially changed its name in 2009 from deCordova Museum and Sculpture Park to deCordova Sculpture Park and Museum. The landscaped lawns, forests, fields, and terraces of deCordova's Sculpture Park reveal a cross-section of how contemporary artists work outdoors, and how outdoor art enters into complex dialogues with sites and environmental conditions. This is accomplished with a three-tiered program of collection works, loans, and site-specific projects and commissions. The collection includes works by significant twentieth- and twenty-first-century artists that provide an art-historical context for other work in the park, and include sculptures by Dorothy Dehner, Antony Gormley, Dan Graham,  Sol LeWitt, Alexander Liberman, Nam June Paik, Beverly Pepper, Jaume Plensa, George Rickey, and Ursula von Rydingsvard. Artists with sculptures currently on loan to deCordova include Jim Dine, DeWitt Godfrey, Paul Matisse, and Isaac Witkin. Site-specific projects and special installations are designed and implemented especially for the Sculpture Park. Recent site-specific works include Steven Siegel’s Big, with Rift; Fritz Horstman's "Formwork for a Spiral Movement"; and a major installation by environmental artist Alan Sonfist, The Endangered Species of New England.  In 2019, deCordova completed work on Watershed, a permanent installation by sculptor Andy Goldsworthy.

References

External links 

deCordova Sculpture Park and Museum The Trustees of Reservations

Buildings and structures in Lincoln, Massachusetts
Museums in Middlesex County, Massachusetts
Art museums and galleries in Massachusetts
Sculpture gardens, trails and parks in the United States
Parks in Middlesex County, Massachusetts
Institutions accredited by the American Alliance of Museums
1950 establishments in Massachusetts
Art museums established in 1950
Boston expressionism